CJLF-FM is a Canadian radio station, broadcasting a Contemporary Christian music format on 100.3 FM in Barrie, Ontario. Using the on-air brand name Life 100.3, the station was founded by Scott Jackson in August 1999 and is owned by Trust Communications Ministries, Inc, which is based in Barrie, Ontario.

On August 27, 2006, CJLF-FM increased its power from 1.8 kW to 18.7 kW. The power was further increased to 40 kW in January 2007.

Programming
In addition to locally oriented programming, the station has produced nationally syndicated programs like the CT-20 countdown of Christian music hits.

Transmitters

Expansion
Trust Communications applied twice for a new station in Kitchener-Waterloo with its own schedule and studios, but these applications were rejected in favour of CJTW-FM.

Trust Communications applied for a transmitter to serve the Inuit residents of Iqaluit, Nunavut with the first Christian station in the territory (which would rebroadcast CJLF-FM); however, this application was rejected.

On September 28, 2011, the CRTC denied Trust's application to increase CJLF-FM-1's power in Owen Sound.

On January 28, 2011, the CRTC revoked the licence of CKLN-FM for regulatory non-compliance. The decision was appealed to the Federal Court of Canada, which denied the appeal on April 15, 2011. The CRTC subsequently issued a call for applications to occupy the now-vacant 88.1 FM frequency on September 28, 2011. Trust Communications filed an application to launch a new Christian music radio station in Toronto. The CRTC rejected Trust Communication's application on September 11, 2012, in favour of a new station, CIND-FM, owned by Rock 95 FM.

References

External links
Life 100.3
The Launch of Life - Christian Flamethrower
 

Jlf
Jlf
Radio stations established in 1999
1999 establishments in Ontario